Dehnow (also known as Dehnow-ye Mollā Moḩammad Taqī) is a village in Eslamiyeh Rural District, in the Central District of Rafsanjan County, Kerman Province, Iran. At the 2006 census, its population was 46, in 14 families.

References 

Populated places in Rafsanjan County